Hyles dahlii is a moth of the family Sphingidae first described by Carl Geyer in 1828.

Distribution 
It is found on Corsica, Sardinia and the Balearic Islands. On rare occasions it is found on Sicily and along the north-eastern coast of Spain. It was introduced to Tunisia in the mid 1980s.

On Menorca, the Hyles dahlii population consists of a hybrid with Hyles euphorbiae. Due to this hybridisation, only few characteristics of Hyles dahlii are present in the imago. There is also hybridisation on Malta. Here it is a hybrid between Hyles dahlii and Hyles tithymali. Research suggests that Hyles dahlii is in fact a species which evolved from Hyles tithymali through isolation.

Description 
The wingspan is 65–85 mm.

Biology 
Adults are on wing from May to June and from August to September in two generations. The larvae feed on various herbaceous plants, including Euphorbia paralias, Euphorbia myrsinites, Euphorbia characias, Euphorbia dendroides, Euphorbia pithyusa, Euphorbia pinea and Euphorbia terracina.

References

External links

"Hyles dahlii (Geyer, 1827)". Moths and Butterflies of Europe and North Africa.
"Hyles dahlii (Geyer, 1828)". Fauna Europaea.
"06854 Hyles dahlii (Geyer, [1827-1828])". Lepiforum e.V.

Hyles (moth)
Moths described in 1827
Moths of Europe
Taxa named by Carl Geyer